Nathan Edward Cook (October 10, 1885 – September 10, 1992) was a sailor in the United States Navy during the Philippine–American War whose naval career continued through the Second World War. When he died at the age of 106 he was the oldest surviving American war veteran.

Biography

Military career
Cook was born on October 10, 1885, in Hersey, Michigan. He left a 50-cent-a-day job at a packing plant in a city from Kansas. He lied about his age (then 15) in order to join the Navy on April 9, 1901, after he saw a recruiting poster which said, "Join the Navy and See the World." He was assigned to the USS Pensacola.

He served during the Philippine–American War, which began shortly after Spain had ceded the Philippines to the United States after losing the Spanish–American War of 1898. The Philippine–American War lasted from 1899 until July 4, 1902 – one year after Cook's enlistment in the Navy.

Cook also saw service in the Boxer Rebellion and clashes along the U.S.–Mexico border.

After 12 and a half years of service as an enlisted man, he was appointed to the warrant officer rank of boatswain on January 11, 1913.

During the First World War he commanded a submarine chaser that sank two German U-boats.

Cook was promoted on August 15, 1918, to the temporary rank of lieutenant and was given command of the tugboat USS Favorite on the 21st of the same month.

Cook received a letter of commendation from the Secretary of the Navy for his role in salvaging the USS Narragansett in February 1919. The text of his commendation reads: "As Commanding Officer of the U.S.S. Favorite he took a conspicuous and creditable part in the operation of salvaging the U.S.S. Narragansett."

After the First World War, Cook was reduced to his permanent rank of Boatswain and then promoted to Chief Boatswain on January 11, 1919.

During the early days of World War II Cook was stationed at Port-au-Prince Haiti and in Panama.  As of November 1, 1940 he was the executive officer of the SS Mormacyork which served as a transport between the United States and South America.

Cook retired on April 1, 1942, after 40 years in the Navy.  He was promoted to the permanent rank of lieutenant the same day in recognition of his service in the First World War. He once said his Navy life was tough but that it beat living on his Missouri farm. During his naval career, Cook's shipmates nicknamed him "Northeast," derived from his first two initials.

Personal life
Cook's father, William Cook, had died in 1895. His mother Ellen later remarried and the family moved to Kansas City, Missouri.

Cook met his wife, Elizabeth (1887–1982) in New York in 1901 and they married on October 29, 1905. Elizabeth died two weeks before what would have been their 77th wedding anniversary in 1982. Cook spent his last years at the residential section of the VA hospital in Phoenix, Arizona and was buried beside his wife at the National Memorial Cemetery of Arizona.

Legacy

Cook was the last living member of the United Spanish War Veterans (USWV). The USWV was an organization of veterans of the Spanish–American War and the Philippine–American War who had served between 1898 and 1902. Cook was eligible to be a member of the USWV because he had enlisted during the Philippine–American War.

Cook was often referred to as a veteran of the Spanish–American War, but the Spanish–American War officially ended in August 1898 and Cook did not enlist in the Navy until April 1901. Because Cook was a member of the USWV, many assumed that he was a Spanish–American War veteran.

Cook was mistakenly recognized as the longest surviving U.S. veteran of that war at the time of his death in 1992 (although there is a claim that Jones Morgan was a Spanish–American War veteran and survived longer). Cook was, however, likely the last surviving veteran of the Philippine–American War.

When Cook turned 104, he received a congratulatory letter from George H. W. Bush and guests watched a video presentation about his life. Cook's younger daughter, Eleanor Kay of Tempe, Arizona, also said around this time: "He was a Navy man throughout. Navy. Navy. Navy. He lived for the Navy. Yes, he had a wife and family, and he enjoyed coming home to see them. But he also enjoyed getting back to his ship."

Awards
 Navy Commendation Ribbon (Later changed to the Navy Commendation Medal.)
 Philippine Campaign Medal
 China Campaign Medal
 Mexican Service Medal
 First World War Victory Medal
 American Defense Service Medal
 American Campaign Medal
 World War Two Victory Medal

See also
 Last surviving United States war veterans

References

External links
 
 Interview with Nathan E. Cook. 1989.
 Oldest known U.S. veteran, Nathan E. Cook, dies at 106. Houston Chronicle. September 11, 1992. Accessed from October 28, 2012.
 Article from the Vanguard "The Spanish–American War Veteran," Veterans Administration Nov./Dec. 1988. lcweb2.loc.gov Accessed from May 7, 2013.

United States Navy sailors
American military personnel of the Spanish–American War
American centenarians
Men centenarians
1885 births
1992 deaths
Burials in Arizona
American military personnel of the Boxer Rebellion
Military personnel from Michigan
United States Navy personnel of World War I